Fritz Lange (born 22 January 1885, date of death unknown) was a German wrestler. He competed in the light heavyweight event at the 1912 Summer Olympics.

References

External links
 

1885 births
Year of death missing
Olympic wrestlers of Germany
Wrestlers at the 1912 Summer Olympics
German male sport wrestlers